is a Japanese manga series written and illustrated by Rihito Takarai. It started serialization in Square Enix's Monthly GFantasy in September 2013. As of November 2018, the individual chapters have been collected into three volumes.

Publication
The series is written and illustrated by Rihito Takarai, and started serialization in Square Enix's Monthly GFantasy on September 18, 2013. As of November 2018, the individual chapters have been collected into three tankōbon volumes.

At Sakura-Con 2017, Yen Press announced they licensed the series for English publication.

Volume list

Reception
Che Gilson from Otaku USA praised the plot, setting, and artwork of the first volume, comparing it to Fullmetal Alchemist. Sarah from Anime UK News concurred with Gilson, praising the plot and artwork of the first volume. Melina Dargis from The Fandom Post concurred with Gilson and Sarah, praising the artwork and plot, and comparing it to Seraph of the End.

References

External links
 

Gangan Comics manga
Science fantasy anime and manga
Shōnen manga
Yen Press titles